The 2016 International Crown was a women's golf team event organized by the LPGA, played July 21–24 at the Merit Club in Libertyville, Illinois, north of Chicago. This was the second International Crown, a biennial match play event contested between teams of four players representing eight countries.

Format
The first three days, Thursday through Saturday, featured round-robin pool play matches at fourball. Each match was worth two points for a win and one point for a halve. Following the completion of pool play, the top two teams in each pool and one wild card team advanced to singles play. The five remaining teams were re-seeded based on points earned in pool play, and each team played one singles match against each of the other teams on Sunday. The total points earned in pool and singles play determined the team champion.

Course

Source:

Teams
On April 3, 2016, eight teams qualified to participate in this event, based on the combined world rankings of the top four players from each country: South Korea, United States, Japan, Chinese Taipei, Thailand, England, China and Australia. Defending champion Spain did not qualify. The team members were finalized on June 13, 2016, and divided into two pools. The top two teams from 2014, Spain and Sweden, failed to make the 2016 field. China and England made the field for the first time.

Changes: 
for South Korea, Inbee Park (ranked 3) did not play due to an injury and the first alternate Jang Ha-na (10) could not play
for Japan, Shiho Oyama (41) did not play due to an injury
for China, Yuting Shi (210) could not play

Results

Day one pool play
Thursday, July 21, 2016

Pool A
South Korea vs. China
Match 7: Yang/Chun (KOR) defeated  Sh. Feng/Lin (CHN), 1 up
Match 8: Si. Feng/Yan (CHN) defeated Ryu/Kim (KOR), 1 up
Australia vs. Chinese Taipei
Match 1: Tseng/Lu (TPE) defeated Webb/Oh (AUS), 3 & 2
Match 2: Kung/Cheng (TPE) defeated Lee/Artis (AUS), 2 up

Standings

Pool B
United States vs. England
Match 5: Ewart Shadoff/Clyburn (ENG) defeated Kerr/Thompson (USA), 2 & 1
Match 6: Hull/Reid (ENG) defeated Piller/Lewis (USA), 2 & 1
Japan vs. Thailand
Match 3: M. Jutanugarn/Phatlum (THA) defeated Miyazato/Nomura (JPN), 2 & 1
Match 4: Suzuki/Watanabe (JPN) and Chutichai/A. Jutanugarn (THA), halved

Standings

Source:

Day two pool play
Friday, July 22, 2016
Pool A
South Korea vs. Chinese Taipei
Match 15: Ryu/Kim (KOR) defeated Tseng/Lu (TPE), 3 & 2
Match 16: Kung/Cheng (TPE) defeated Yang/Chun (KOR), 2 & 1
Australia vs. China
Match 9: Lee/Oh (AUS) and Sh. Feng/Lin (CHN), halved
Match 10: Webb/Artis (AUS) defeated Si. Feng/Yan (CHN), 2 & 1

Standings

Pool B
United States vs. Thailand
Match 13: Piller/Lewis (USA) and M. Jutanugarn/Phatlum (THA), halved
Match 14: Kerr/Thompson (USA) defeated Chutichai/A. Jutanugarn (THA), 4 & 3
Japan vs. England
Match 11: Suzuki/Watanabe (JPN) and Ewart Shadoff/Clyburn (ENG), halved
Match 12: Miyazato/Nomura (JPN) defeated Hull/Reid (ENG), 1 up (Hull did not play due to illness)

Standings

Source:

Day three pool play
Saturday, July 23, 2016
Sunday, July 24, 2016

Play was suspended due to lightning with only the South Korea/Australia matches yet to be completed. England and the United States advanced to singles play from pool B. Play resumed Sunday morning with South Korea winning both its matches with Australia to advance, along with Chinese Taipei, to singles play.

Pool A
South Korea vs. Australia
Match 23: Yang/Chun (KOR) defeated Lee/Oh (AUS), 1 up
Match 24: Ryu/Kim (KOR) defeated Webb/Artis (AUS), 3 & 2
Chinese Taipei vs. China
Match 19: Kung/Lu (TPE) and Sh. Feng/Si. Feng (CHN), halved
Match 20: Yan/Lin (CHN) defeated Tseng/Cheng (TPE), 5 & 4

Standings

Pool B
United States vs. Japan
Match 21: Piller/Lewis (USA) defeated Miyazato/Nomura (JPN), 2 & 1
Match 22: Kerr/Thompson (USA) defeated Suzuki/Watanabe (JPN), 4 & 2
Thailand vs. England
Match 17: Ewart Shadoff/Clyburn (ENG) defeated Phatlum/Chutichai (THA), 7 & 5
Match 18: Hull/Reid (ENG) defeated A. Jutanugarn/M. Jutanugarn/(THA), 2 & 1

Standings

Wild card
China, Japan, and Thailand advanced to the wildcard playoff by finishing third in their pools. Japan advanced when Ayaka Watanabe eagled the first playoff hole.

Standings

Singles play
Sunday, July 24, 2016

Match 25: Kung (TPE) defeated Suzuki (JPN), 2 & 1
Match 26: Lewis (USA) defeated Miyazato (JPN), 3 & 2
Match 27: Piller (USA) defeated Tseng (TPE), 4 & 3
Match 28: Nomura (JPN) defeated Yang (KOR), 3 & 2
Match 29: Watanabe (JPN) defeated Clyburn (ENG), 1 up
Match 30: Lu (TPE) defeated Chun (KOR), 4 & 3
Match 31: Ewart Shadoff (ENG) defeated Cheng (TPE), 1 up
Match 32: Ryu (KOR) defeated Thompson (USA), 2 & 1
Match 33: Kerr (USA) defeated Reid (ENG), 3 & 2
Match 34: Kim (KOR) defeated Hull (ENG), 5 & 4

Source:

Final standings

References

External links

Merit Club

International Crown
Golf in Illinois
International Crown
International Crown
International Crown